The 2011–12 season was Colchester United's 70th season in their history and fourth successive season in the third tier of English football, League One. Alongside competing in the League One, the club also participated in the FA Cup, the League Cup and the Football League Trophy.

John Ward led his side to another tenth-place finish in League One this term, with few changes made to the squad of the previous season. Club stalwart Karl Duguid returned to the club after three years at Plymouth Argyle, while another in Pat Baldwin left for Southend United. Youth team product Anthony Wordsworth blossomed in midfield, ending the season as the club's top scorer with 13 goals. The U's would finish the season 14 points shy of the play-off positions.

In the cups, Colchester suffered early exits in the League Cup and Football League Trophy to Wycombe Wanderers and Barnet respectively, while they reached the second round of the FA Cup but were beaten by Swindon Town.

Season overview
Colchester's campaign ran in a similar fashion to the previous season, ending in the same tenth position in the league and suffering early exits in the cup competitions. John Ward consolidated the U's position in League One while chairman Robbie Cowling was cutting back on first-team spending and investing in new youth facilities to ensure the long term future for the club.

The season saw the emergence of Tom Eastman, a young Colchester-born centre back signed from Ipswich Town in the summer, while Anthony Wordsworth continued his development in central midfield, ending the season as the club's top scorer.

Colchester suffered some heavy defeats, including 5–1 and 6–1 home defeats by Milton Keynes Dons and Stevenage respectively, while they suffered 4–1 defeats on the road at Bury and Notts County, while Sheffield United put three past the U's at Bramall Lane.

However, Colchester did earn big home victories over Bury and Notts County at home, while also beating Preston North End home and away.

Players

Transfers

In

 Total spending:  ~ £0

Out

 Total incoming:  ~ £0

Loans in

Loans out

Match details

Friendlies

League One

League table

Results round by round

Matches

Football League Cup

Football League Trophy

FA Cup

Squad statistics

Appearances and goals

|-
!colspan="16"|Players who appeared for Colchester who left during the season

|}

Goalscorers

Disciplinary record

Captains
Number of games played as team captain.

Clean sheets
Number of games goalkeepers kept a clean sheet.

Player debuts
Players making their first-team Colchester United debut in a fully competitive match.

See also
List of Colchester United F.C. seasons

References

General

Specific

2011-12
2011–12 Football League One by team